is the sixth installment of the Jewelpet anime franchise created by Sanrio and Sega and animated by both Zexcs and Studio Comet. It was first announced by Sanrio on their official Twitter page to coincide with the anime franchise's 5th anniversary. The series aired on April 5, 2014, on TV Tokyo and TV Osaka and is directed by Itsuro Kawasaki and written by Natsuko Takahashi. It is the first Jewelpet installment to be officially handled by Zexcs who co-produced the Jewelpet Twinkle Fan Discs and the OVA episode.

The story focuses on Momona, a girl from Jewel Land who accidentally gets transported into a mysterious place during her cousin's wedding reception. Standing in front of Jewel Land's prestigious Jewel Palace alongside the other girls, she meets Ruby, a white rabbit Jewelpet who chooses her to be her partner and become a Petit Lady. Knowing all the trials will be hard, she and Ruby must persevere in order for her to become a proper lady and gain the title of being a Lady Jewel. But standing in their way is Lillian and her Jewelpet partner, Luea, who also both want the same title and also, the hand of Prince Cayenne.

Jun Ichikawa was hired to compose the music, while J-Pop band Fairies performs the series' respective opening and ending theme songs, Your Love (as M-Three) and RUN with U.

An official DVD boxset of the series, containing all the episodes, was released by Frontier Works on July 7, 2015. The boxset also contains official character art, information on the characters and extra bonuses.

Episode list

References

General
 http://www.tv-tokyo.co.jp/anime/jewelpet6/index2.html

Specific

Lady